An impostor (also spelled imposter) is a person who pretends to be somebody else, often through means of disguise. Their objective is usually to try to gain financial or social advantages through social engineering, but also often for purposes of espionage or law enforcement.

Notable impostors

False nationality claims
 Princess Caraboo (1791–1864), Englishwoman who pretended to be a princess from a fictional island
 Korla Pandit (1921–1998), African-American pianist/organist who pretended to be from India
 George Psalmanazar (1679–1763), who claimed to be from Formosa
 Micheál Mac Liammóir (1899–1978), notable actor in Ireland, born in England as Alfred Willmore but invented an Irish birth and identity

False minority national identity claims
 Joseph Boyden (born 1966), Canadian writer who falsely claimed First Nations ancestry
 H. G. Carrillo (1960–2020), American writer and assistant professor of English at George Washington University who claimed to be a Cuban immigrant despite having been born in Detroit to American parents.
 Asa Earl Carter (1925–1979), who under the alias of supposedly Cherokee writer Forrest Carter authored several books, including The Education of Little Tree
 Chief Buffalo Child Long Lance (1890–1932), an African American who claimed to be the son of a Blackfoot chief
 Iron Eyes Cody (1904–1999), Italian American actor (the "crying Indian chief" in the "Keep America Beautiful" public service announcements in the early 1970s), who claimed to be of Cherokee-Cree ancestry
 Helen Darville (born 1972), Australian writer who falsely claimed Ukrainian ancestry as part of the basis of her novel The Hand that Signed the Paper about a Ukrainian family who collaborated with Nazis in the Holocaust
 Rachel Dolezal (born 1977), former president of the NAACP in Spokane, Washington, who claimed African-American heritage despite being born to white parents
 Grey Owl (1888–1938), born Archibald Belaney, an Englishman who took on the identity of an Ojibwe
 Jamake Highwater (1931–2001), writer and journalist, born Jackie Marks into an Ashkenazi family who later claimed he was a Cherokee American Indian
 Jessica A. Krug (aka Jess La Bombalera, born 1982), former associate professor at George Washington University who falsely claimed African, African-American, and Caribbean-American heritage throughout her career, despite being born to Jewish parents
 Sacheen Littlefeather (Marie Louise Cruz, 1946-2022), model and activist who rejected Marlon Brando's Academy Award at the 1973 Oscars out of protest. Her Apache Indian impersonation was not made public until her funeral, when her sisters asserted their Mexican descent.
 BethAnn McLaughlin,  neuroscientist who impersonated a bisexual Native American using the Twitter handle "@Sciencing_bi".
 Red Thunder Cloud (1919–1996), an African American who claimed to be the last speaker of the Catawba language
 Andrea Smith, an American academic, feminist, and activist against violence who claimed Cherokee identity without proof or acceptance by the Cherokee nation
 Two Moon Meridas (c. 1888–1933), seller of herbal medicine who claimed that he was of Sioux birth

False royal heritage claims
See also: False pretenders

 Maddess Aiort claimed to have been Grand Duchess Tatiana Nikolaevna of Russia
 Granny Alina claimed to have been Grand Duchess Maria Nikolaevna of Russia
 Michelle Anches claimed to have been Grand Duchess Tatiana of Russia
 Anna Anderson (1896–1984), who may have really believed she was the Grand Duchess Anastasia of Russia, daughter of Tsar Nicholas II of Russia
 Bardiya (d. 522 BC), ancient ruler of Persia, widely regarded as genuine but was claimed to be an imposter by his successor
 Mary Baynton (fl. c.1533), pretended to be Henry VIII's daughter, Mary at a time many considered that her father should be deposed in her favour
 Bhawal case, concerning a "resurrected" Indian prince who may have genuinely believed he was who he claimed to be
 Natalya Bilikhodze (1900–2000), appeared in the year 1995 and went to Russia in the year 2000 where she tried to claim the "Romanov fortune" as Grand Duchess Anastasia of Russia, daughter of Tsar Nicholas II of Russia.
 Marga Boodts claimed to have been Grand Duchess Olga Nikolaevna of Russia
 Helga de la Brache (1817–1885), claimed to have been the secret legitimate daughter of Gustav IV Adolf of Sweden and Frederica of Baden.
 Alexis Brimeyer (1946–1995), Belgian who claimed connection to various European royal houses
 Mary Carleton (1642–1673), who was, amongst other things, a false princess and bigamist
 Count Dante (1939–1975) is the assumed name of John Keehan, who claimed to be descended from Spanish nobility. In his campaign to promote his system of martial arts, he also claimed victories in various secret deathmatches in Asia, and mercenary activity in Cuba, none of which was proven.
 Suzanna Catharina de Graaff (1905–1968), was a Dutch woman who claimed to be the fifth daughter of Nicholas and Alexandra, born in 1903 when Alexandra was reported to have had a "hysterical pregnancy".[13] There are no official or private records of Alexandra giving birth to any child at this time.
 Pseudo-Constantine Diogenes, pretended to be a son of Byzantine emperor Romanos IV Diogenes
 False Dmitriy I (c. 1581 – 1606), False Dmitriy II (died 1610), and False Dmitriy III (died 1612), who all impersonated the son of Ivan the Terrible
 Harry Domela (1905 – after 1978), who pretended to be an heir to the German throne
 Anna Ekelöf (fl. 1765), claimed to have been Crown Prince Gustav of Sweden.
 Anthony Gignac (1970), falsely took on the identity of Saudi prince Khalid bin Al Saud to entrap victims in investment scams and other schemes, currently serving an 18 year jail sentence
 Michael Goleniewski (1922–1993), was a CIA agent who in the year 1959 claimed to be Tsarevich Alexei of Russia
 Anna Gyllander (fl. 1659), claimed to have been queen Christina of Sweden.
 Anatoly Ionov claims to be the son of Grand Duchess Anastasia Nikolaevna of Russia
 Tile Kolup (d. 1285), also known as Dietrich Holzschuh, was an impostor who in 1284 began to pretend to be the Emperor Frederick II
 Eugenio Lascorz (1886–1962), who claimed connection to the royal house of the Byzantine Empire
 Terence Francis MacCarthy (born 1957), styled himself MacCarthy Mór and "Prince of Desmond"
 Šćepan Mali (d. 1773), who claimed to be Peter III of Russia, and managed to rule Montenegro
 False Margaret (c. 1260–1301), who impersonated the Maid of Norway
 Pierre Plantard (1920–2000), the mastermind behind the Priory of Sion hoax who claimed to be Merovingian, a pretender to the throne of France
 Yemelyan Pugachev (c. 1742–1775), who claimed to be Peter III of Russia
 Raiktor (fl. 1081), an Eastern Orthodox monk who assumed the identity of Byzantine Emperor Michael VII
 Frederick Rolfe (1860–1913), who is better known as Baron Corvo
 Lambert Simnel (c. 1477 – c. 1525), pretender to the throne of England
 Eugenia Smith (1899–1997), another woman who claimed to be the Grand Duchess Anastasia of Russia
 Charles Stopford claimed to be the Earl of Buckingham
 Heino Tammet claimed to be Tsarevich Alexei of Russia. He died in 1977 in Vancouver, Canada.
 Larissa Tudor appeared strikingly similar to Grand Duchess Tatiana Nikolaevna of Russia but never actually claimed to be the former grand duchess. Many people who knew Larissa strongly suspected that she was the former grand duchess of Russia.
 Nadezhda Vasilyeva, appeared in the 1920s in Russia and claimed to be Grand Duchess Anastasia of Russia. She died in a psychiatric ward in 1971 in Kazan, Russia.
 Perkin Warbeck (c. 1474 – 1499), pretender to the throne of England

Fraudsters
 Frank Abagnale (born 1948), who passed bad checks as a fake pilot, doctor, and lawyer
 Gerald Barnbaum (1933–2018), former pharmacist who posed as a doctor for over twenty years, assuming the identities of various licensed physicians
 Alessandro Cagliostro (1743–1795), Italian adventurer and self-styled magician
 Cassie Chadwick (1857–1907), who pretended to be Andrew Carnegie's daughter
 Ravi Desai, (active 1996-2002), a journalist who posed as Robert Klinger, fictitious chief executive officer of BMW's North American division, in a series of articles for Slate magazine
 Belle Gibson (born 1991), an Australian alternative wellness advocate who falsely claimed to have survived multiple cancers without using conventional cancer treatments
 David Hampton (1964–2003), who pretended to be the son of Sidney Poitier
 Joseph "Harry" Jelinek (1905–1986), who is alleged to have fraudulently sold the Karlstejn Castle to American industrialists
 Brian Kim (born 1975/1976), lived in Christodora House in Manhattan, falsified documents identifying himself as the president-secretary of its condo association, and transferred $435,000 from the association's bank account to his own bank account
 Sante Kimes (1934-2014), impersonated various public figures and was convicted of murdering her own landlady, wealthy socialite Irene Silverman, in an apparent plot to assume Silverman's identity
 Mandla Lamba, "fake billionaire" from South Africa who received media attention by claiming to be a successful mining tycoon.
 Victor Lustig (1890–1947), "The man who sold the Eiffel Tower. Twice."
 Richard Allen Minsky (born 1944), who lured women into vulnerable situations by pretending to be people they knew, then lawyers representing them, and then raped them
 Arthur Orton (1834–1898), also known as the Tichborne Claimant, who claimed to be the missing heir Sir Roger Tichborne
 Paul Palaiologos Tagaris (c. 1320/40 – after 1394), Orthodox monk, claimed to be a member of the Palaiologos dynasty, pretended to be the Orthodox Patriarch of Jerusalem, later succeeded in being named Latin Patriarch of Constantinople
 Frederick Emerson Peters (1885–1959), U.S. celebrity impersonator and writer of bad checks
 Gert Postel (born 1958), a mail carrier who posed as a medical doctor
 Lobsang Rampa (1910–1981), formerly plumber Cyril Hoskins, who claimed to be possessed by the spirit of a deceased Tibetan lama and wrote a number of books based on that premise
 James Reavis (1843–1914), master forger who used his real name but created a complex, fictitious history that pointed to him as the rightful owner of much of Arizona
 Anna Sorokin (born 1991), posed as a fictitious wealthy heiress to fraudulently obtain loans, luxury goods, travel, and stays at exclusive hotels
 Leander Tomarkin (1895–1967), fake doctor who became the personal physician of Victor Emmanuel III of Italy, and convinced Albert Einstein to assume the honorary presidency of one of his medical conferences

Wartime impostors and spies
Many women in history have presented themselves as men in order to advance in typically male-dominated fields. There are many documented cases of this in the military during the American Civil War. However their purpose was rarely for fraudulent gain. They are listed in the List of wartime cross-dressers.

Spies have often pretended to be people other than they were. One of the famous was Chevalier d'Eon (1728–1810), a French diplomat who successfully infiltrated the court of Empress Elizabeth of Russia by presenting as a woman.

Military impostors

Historically, when military record-keeping was less accurate than today, some persons—primarily men—falsely claimed to be war veterans to obtain military pensions. Most did not make extravagant claims, because they were seeking money, not public attention that might expose their fraud. In the modern world, reasons for posing as a member of the military or exaggerating one's service record vary, but the intent is almost always to gain the respect and admiration of others.
 Joseph A. Cafasso (born 1956), former Fox News military analyst who claimed to have been a highly decorated U.S. Army Special Forces soldier and Vietnam War veteran, but actually served in the army for only 44 days in 1976
 Brian Dennehy (1938–2020), American actor who enlisted in the United States Marine Corps in 1958, served in Okinawa, and never saw combat, but later falsely claimed to have been wounded in action in the Vietnam War 
 George Dupre (1903–1982), who claimed that he worked for the Special Operations Executive (SOE) and the French Resistance during World War II (WWII); Dupre served in World War II, but he was never in France, nor with the SOE
 Frank Dux (born 1956), Canadian-American martial artist who served in the United States Marine Corps Reserve in non-combat roles, but claimed in his memoir The Secret Man that he had fought in covert Central Intelligence Agency (CIA) special operations in Southeast Asia, Nicaragua, the Iran–Iraq War and the Gulf War; his claims drew a rare public denial from the CIA describing them as "preposterous".
 Joseph Ellis (born 1943), American professor and historian who claimed a tour of duty in the Vietnam War, but who actually obtained an academic deferral of service and then taught history at West Point
 Jack Livesey (born 1954), British historian, military advisor on film productions, and author who claimed to have a distinguished twenty-year career in the Parachute Regiment, but actually served as a cook in the Army Catering Corps for three years
 Jesse Macbeth (born 1984), anti-war activist who claimed to be a United States Army Ranger and veteran of the Iraq War, but was actually discharged from the army before completing basic training
 Joseph McCarthy (1908–1957), U.S. senator who served in the Marine Corps during World War II as a Douglas SBD Dauntless tail gunner; broadly embellished his military accomplishments, notably by exaggerating his number of combat missions flown, falsifying official records to reflect these claims, obtaining combat decorations based on the falsified documents, and claiming that he broke his leg in action when the injury was sustained in a non-combat stairwell fall
 Alan Mcilwraith (born 1978), a call centre worker from Glasgow who, among other things, claimed that he was a decorated captain in the British Army; he never served in the military
 Eric von Stroheim, film director (The Merry Widow, 1925) and actor (Sunset Boulevard, 1950), who claimed to have been an Austrian imperial military officer, but never served in the military. He did portray German officers on-screen.
 Friedrich Wilhelm Voigt (1849–1922), German impostor who masqueraded as a Prussian officer in 1906 and became famous as "The Captain of Köpenick"
 Micah Wright (born 1974), anti-war activist who claimed to have been an Army Ranger involved in the United States invasion of Panama and several special operations; he was a Reserve Officers' Training Corps student in college, but never served in the military

Multiple impostors
 Frédéric Bourdin (born 1974), "the French Chameleon"
 Barry Bremen (1947–2011), known in the sports world as "The Great Imposter", after pretending to be an MLB umpire, an NBA All-Star, and a Dallas Cowboys Cheerleader, among other things
 Ferdinand Waldo Demara (1921–1982), "The Great Impostor", who masqueraded as many people, from monks to surgeons to prison wardens
 Christian Gerhartsreiter (born 1961), a serial impostor and convicted murderer who infamously posed as a member of the Rockefeller family and became the subject of several books
 Marvin Hewitt (born 1922), who impersonated several academics and became a university physics professor
 Stanley Clifford Weyman (1890–1960), American multiple impostor who impersonated public officials, including the U.S. Secretary of State and various military officers
 Laurel Rose Willson (1941–2002), who claimed to be "Lauren Stratford", a victim of satanic ritual abuse, and later as Holocaust survivor "Laura Grabowski"
 Mamoru Samuragochi (born 1963), who claimed to be a "deaf composer", though it was later revealed that his hearing ability has already improved and most of his works were written by Takashi Niigaki, conductor of "Onimusha Soundtrack", produced by Samuragouchi.

Others
 Bampfylde Moore Carew (1693–1759), a Devonshire man whose popular Life and Adventures included picaresque episodes of vagabond life, including his claim to have been elected King of the Beggars
 Alan Conway (1934–1998), who impersonated Stanley Kubrick during the early 1990s
 Misha Defonseca (born 1937) Belgian Catholic woman who took the identity of a Jewish Holocaust survivor
 Alicia Esteve Head (born 1973), Spanish woman who claimed to be a survivor of the September 11 attacks, under the name Tania Head
 James Frey (born 1969) American writer who presented himself as a reformed convict and drug addict, who in actuality had no criminal record
 Martin Gray (1921–2016), Polish Jew who falsely claimed to have been imprisoned in Treblinka extermination camp
 Kaspar Hauser (1812–1833), German youth who claimed to have grown up in the total isolation of a darkened cell
 Robert Hendy-Freegard (born 1971), English barman, car salesman and conman who masqueraded as a MI5 agent
 James Hogue (born 1959), who entered Princeton University by posing as a self-taught orphan
 Paul Jordan-Smith (1885–1971), father of the hoax art movement called Disumbrationism
 Rahul Ligma, who pretended to be a fired Twitter employee, pranking major media outlets in 2022
 Enric Marco (1921–2022), Spaniard who claimed to have been a prisoner in the Nazi German concentration camps Mauthausen and Flossenburg in World War II
 Brian MacKinnon (born c. 1963), who at the age of thirty attended Bearsden Academy by posing as a teenager
 Rosemarie Pence (born 1938), American woman who falsely claimed to have been a German Jew imprisoned at Dachau concentration camp, and told her stories in an authorized biography Hannah: From Dachau to the Olympics and Beyond
 Stephen Rannazzisi (born 1978), American actor and comedian who claimed to be a survivor of the September 11 attacks
 Steven Jay Russell (born 1957), who has impersonated judges and a doctor, among others, and is known for escaping from prison multiple times
 George Santos (born 1988), Brazilian-American elected to the U.S. House of Representatives in 2022 claiming to be a college-educated financier, philanthropist and real estate investor as well as Jewish and the grandson of Holocaust survivors, who later admitted that he fabricated most of his résumé
 Arnaud du Tilh (1524–1560), who took the place of Martin Guerre in the mid-16th century and lived with Guerre's wife and son for three years before being discovered when Guerre returned
 Donald J. Watt (1918–2000), Australian soldier who claimed to have been a Sonderkommando at Auschwitz concentration camp
 Binjamin Wilkomirski (born 1941), who adopted a constructed identity as a Holocaust survivor and published author
 Gabriel Wortman (1968–2020), Canadian denturist who masqueraded as a police officer and drove a bogus Royal Canadian Mounted Police cruiser while perpetrating the 2020 Nova Scotia attacks

In fiction

See also

 Catfishing
 Charlatan
 Disability pretender
 
 Miriam Coles Harris
 Identity theft
 Impersonator
 Impostor syndrome
 Messiah claimant
 Political decoy
 Poseur

References

External links

 The Fake Warrior Project, POW Network

Deception

Impostors